Stereotypes of American people (here meaning citizens of the United States) can today be found in virtually all cultures. They are often manifest in America's own television and in the media's portrayal of the United States as seen in other countries, but can also be spread by literature, art, and public opinion. Not all of the stereotypes are equally popular, nor are they all restricted to Americans; and although most can be considered negative, a few assign neutral, positive or admiring qualities to the stereotypical U.S. citizen. Many of the ethnic stereotypes collide with otherwise unrelated political anti-Americanism.

Stereotypes with positive use

Generosity
According to American William Bennett a positive stereotype of Americans is that they are very generous. The United States sends aid and supplies to many countries, and Americans may be seen as people who are charitable or volunteer. Alexis de Tocqueville first noted in 1835 the American attitude towards helping others in need. A 2010 Charities Aid Foundation study found that Americans were the fifth most willing to donate time and money in the world at 55%.  Total charitable contributions in 2010 were higher in the US than in any other country.

Optimism

Americans may be seen as very positive and optimistic people.  Optimism is seen as the driving force behind achievement of the American Dream.

Hardworking nature

Americans may be stereotyped as hardworking people, whether in their jobs or other matters.

Frontier mentality 
Traits such as engaging in risky exploration to secure food and territory favored early Americans, as well as the willingness to move one's life in pursuit of goals such as personal freedom and economic affluence. These traits may have distilled over time into an individualism characterized by toughness and self-reliance.

Friendliness 
Americans have been seen as friendly, talkative, and open to conversation.

Stereotypes with negative use

Obsession with guns
The United States has a historical fondness for guns, and this is often portrayed in American media. A considerable percentage of Americans own firearms, and the United States has some of the developed world's highest death rates caused by firearms. A 2018 article attributed the high death rates to mass shootings or inner city violence, but the murder rate in America was then on a decline, and it appeared that suicide by firearm is a large contributor to the "gun-deaths" statistic. The international media often report American mass shootings, making these incidents well known internationally despite the fact that these kind of killings account for an extremely small portion of the firearms death rate. In 2007, the United States was ranked number one in gun ownership with a rate of 88.8 guns per 100 residents. In 2017, the United States again ranked number one in gun ownership with a rate of 120.5 guns per 100 citizens.

Materialism, over-consumption, and extreme capitalism

A common stereotype of Americans is that of economic materialism and capitalism. They may be seen as caring most about money, judging all things by their economic value, and scorning those of lower socioeconomic status. However, the US has long been considered to be one of the most charitable nations in the world by a wide margin. Americans are extremely charitable by global standards: according to a 2016 study by the Charities Aid Foundation, Americans donated 1.44% of total GDP to charity, the highest in the world by a large margin.

Lack of cultural awareness

Americans may be stereotyped as ignorant of countries and cultures beyond their own. This stereotype shows them as lacking intellectual curiosity, thus making them ignorant of other cultures, places, or lifestyles outside of the United States. The idea of American students dumbing down is attributed to the declining standards of American schools and curricula.

Racism and racialism

American people in general may be portrayed as racist or racialist, often discriminating against their minorities. Racism had a significant presence in American history and is still relevant today. According to Albert Einstein, racism is America's "worst disease". In a 2017 survey, 58% of Americans said that racism is a "big problem in our society".

Environmental ignorance

Americans may be seen as reckless and imprudent people regarding the preservation of the environment. They may be portrayed as lavish, driving high polluting SUVs and unconcerned about climate change or global warming. The United States (whose population is 327 million) has the second-highest carbon dioxide emissions after China (whose population is 1.4 billion), is one of the few countries which did not ratify the Kyoto Protocol, and is one of just three countries to refuse to participate in the Paris Agreement after its withdrawal from the agreement in June 2017. In the context of stereotyping, it is perhaps more relevant to look at  production per capita; the USA compares favorably with oil-producing nations in the Middle East, with Qatar at 40.3 metric tons per capita versus the United States' 17.6 metric tons per capita, though they are behind most European countries. Germany, for instance, emits only 9.1 metric tons per capita. However, the United States has reduced their energy-related greenhouse gas emissions by 12% from 2005 to 2018 while, in the same time period, the world's energy-related emissions have increased by 24%.

Arrogance and nationalism

Americans are often stereotyped as arrogant people. They are frequently depicted in foreign media as excessively nationalistic and obnoxiously patriotic, believing the United States is better than all other countries and patronizing foreigners.

Americans may be seen by people of other countries as arrogant and egomaniacal. In 2009, then-U.S. President Barack Obama said that the United States has "shown arrogance and been dismissive, even derisive" towards its allies.

Military zeal

Another common stereotype is that Americans want to be "the world's policemen", believing that the entire world needs their help – even if this results in preemptive military intervention – because they are somehow exceptional. This relatively recent stereotype spawned from Cold War and post-Cold War military interventions such as the Vietnam War and Iraq War, which many people opposed.

The United States is also stereotyped being a country with Hero syndrome in foreign media. The Hero syndrome manifests itself when the protagonist suffering the syndrome creates supposed, implied or ostensible crises only to eventually resolve them thereby becoming the savior of the day, the hero of the moment.

Workaholic culture
While the stereotype of hard-working Americans is often a positive one, the United States has also been criticized in recent years as a workaholic culture. In The Huffington Post, Tijana Milosevic, a Serbian who had traveled to Washington, D.C. for a degree, wrote, "In fact my family and friends had observed that I shouldn’t have chosen America, since I would probably feel better in Western Europe — where life is not as fast paced as in the US and capitalism still has a 'human face.'" She noted that "Americans still work nine full weeks (350 hours) longer than West Europeans do and paid vacation days across Western Europe are well above the US threshold." Researchers at Oxford Economics hired by the US Travel Association estimated that in 2014 "about 169m [vacation] days, equivalent to $52.4bn in lost benefits", went unused by American workers. Professor Gary L. Cooper argued Americans "have a great deal to learn from Europeans about getting better balance between work and life" and wrote:

The notion that working long hours and not taking holidays makes for a more productive workforce is, in my view, a managerial myth, with no foundation in organizational or psychological science. The human body is a biological machine, and like all machines can wear out. In addition, if employees don't invest personal disposal time in their relationships outside, with their family, loved ones and friends, they will be undermining the very social support systems they may need in difficult and stressful times.

Driving habits
Americans are seen to be over-reliant on personal automobiles. They are also seen to be easily confused by roundabouts.

Consequences of American stereotypes

Along with many stereotypes, nations view the United States as one of the most powerful nations in the world. However, this view is often coupled with the view that the United States is corrupt, arrogant, cold and/or bloodthirsty. Peter Glick, co-author of "Anti-American Sentiment and America's Perceived Intent to Dominate: An 11-Nation Study", conducted research on 5,000 college students from eleven countries using the stereotype content model (SCM) and the image theory (IT) measure. "Consistent with the SCM and IT measure was the view that the United States is a nation  intent on domination also with predicted perceptions that the nation is lacking warmth, and that the nation is arrogant, but out of incompetence." As a result of similar views, anti-American sentiment can develop, and the United States’ security can be put at risk. For example, one of the most infamous anti-American acts against the United States was the 9/11 attacks. American stereotypes were not the main proponent of these attacks, but stereotypes become self-fulfilling and normative. If America is seen as arrogant, power hungry, intrusive, etc., then it is perceived that most American individuals exhibit this behavior, at least to some degree, and that the nation as a whole involves itself in situations in which it may have no business interfering.

See also
American imperialism
Americanization
Americentrism
Anti-Americanism
American studies
Climate change in the United States
Culture of the United States
Global warming controversy in the United States
Media bias in the United States
Propaganda in the United States
Stereotypes of groups within the United States
British stereotypes

References

Further reading

 Pells, Richard. Not like Us: How Europeans Have Loved, Hated and Transformed American Culture since World War II (1997) online

Americans
Anti-Americanism